Polina Alexeyevna Popova (born 1 June 1995) is a Russian model and beauty pageant titleholder who was crowned Miss Russia 2017. She represented Russia at the Miss World 2017 competition, where she placed in the Top 10.

Early life
Popova was born in Yekaterinburg. She works as a model, and in addition to Russian, she can speak fluent English and Chinese. Prior to Miss Russia, Popova was studying at Moscow State University, with plans to become a journalist.

Personal life
She has a boyfriend however she did not want to talk about her personal life because she is a really private person.  They married on  February 11, 2020. On May 25, 2020, she gave birth to her child named Alexander.

Pageantry

Miss Russia 2017
Popova represented Sverdlovsk Oblast in the Miss Russia 2017 pageant; it was her first ever pageant. She went on to win the competition, winning ₽3,000,000, a Hyundai Solaris, and the opportunity to study at any university in the world. Her runners-up were Ksenia Alexandrova of Moscow and Albina Akhtyamova of Bashkortostan.

Miss World 2017
Popova represented Russia in the Miss World 2017 competition, where she placed in the Top 10.

References

External links
 

1995 births
Living people
People from Yekaterinburg
Russian beauty pageant winners
Russian female models
Miss Russia winners
Miss World 2017 delegates